Franz Tost (born 20 January 1956 in Trins, Austria) is an Austrian former racing driver and current team principal of the Scuderia AlphaTauri Formula One team.

Early life 
Tost competed in Formula Ford and Formula Three, and won the Austrian Formula Ford Championship in 1983. He felt that he was not skilled enough to get to the top of motorsport, so decided to study Sport Science and Management at the University of Innsbruck and the University of Vienna which led him to a job as team manager at the Walter Lechner Racing School. In 1993 he joined Willi Weber where he initially ran the WTS Formula Three team. There he met a young Ralf Schumacher and was asked by Willi Weber to accompany him to Japan.

Formula One career 

In 2000 Ralf Schumacher joined the Williams Formula 1 team. Tost followed him, working for Williams' engine supplier BMW as Track Operations Manager until 1 January 2006.

In 2005 Tost was appointed as the team principal of Scuderia Toro Rosso which was the new name of former team Minardi after Red Bull acquired the team. Tost stated that he would aim for fifth place in the Constructors' Championship. He achieved his best results with the team in 2008, 2019 and 2021 landing in the sixth spot in each of these seasons.

He retained the role of team principal when Toro Rosso were re-christened as AlphaTauri at the beginning of the 2020 season. Tost is one of the longest serving Formula One team principals of all time.

Tost is often described as hard-working and professional. He is straightforward and not shy of sharing his opinion.

Criticism 
Following the 2007 European Grand Prix, at the Nürburgring in Germany, it was alleged that Tost assaulted driver Scott Speed over an incident on the track. After Tost later denied the incident, Speed went to the press describing the acrimonious situation at the team, stating that "after coming out and denying this stuff, it's just another very dishonest thing that Franz or Gerhard have said in the media to damage me and Tonio". Speed also stated that he did not want to race for Tost and Berger again.

References

1956 births
Living people
People from Innsbruck-Land District
Formula One team principals
Motorsport agents
Austrian sports agents
German Formula Three Championship drivers
Austrian motorsport people
Scuderia Toro Rosso
Sportspeople from Tyrol (state)

Walter Lechner Racing drivers